Medium Rare is a covers album by Foo Fighters. The album was released on April 16, 2011, as a limited-edition vinyl for Record Store Day, an event that celebrates independent record stores. Apart from the new recordings of "Bad Reputation" and "This Will Be Our Year" and the live version of "Young Man Blues", all tracks have been previously released as B-sides or in other compilation albums.

A CD edition of the album was also given free to new subscribers of Q magazine for a limited time, with the song "Darling Nikki" omitted.

Track listing

Note: "Darling Nikki" does not appear on the Q magazine CD and Humo release. 
 – Although the official description says only two songs are previously unreleased, "Young Man Blues" was previously recorded but does not appear on any releases.

Charts

Personnel
Foo Fighters
Dave Grohl – lead vocals, backing vocals, rhythm guitar (except tracks 7-8 and 12), lead guitar (tracks 7-8 and 12)
Pat Smear – rhythm guitar (tracks 5, 7-8 & 12), lead guitar (track 5)
Nate Mendel – bass guitar
Taylor Hawkins – drums (except tracks 7, 9 and 12), backing vocals on tracks, lead vocals (tracks 2-3 & 10)
Chris Shiflett – lead guitar (except tracks 7-8 and 12), lead vocals on track 9
Rami Jaffee - keyboards on track 13
William Goldsmith - drums (tracks 7 and 12)

Additional personnel
Gregg Bissonette – drums on track 9
Brian May – lead guitar on track 10

References

External links

2011 compilation albums
Foo Fighters compilation albums
Record Store Day releases
Covers albums